The following is a list of notable deaths in July 2019.

Entries for each day are listed alphabetically by surname. A typical entry lists information in the following sequence:
 Name, age, country of citizenship at birth, subsequent country of citizenship (if applicable), reason for notability, cause of death (if known), and reference.

July 2019

1
Ezzat Abou Aouf, 70, Egyptian actor, liver and heart failure.
Joseph Bolangi Egwanga Ediba Tasame, 81, Congolese Roman Catholic prelate, Bishop of Budjala (1974–2009).
Bob Collymore, 61, Guyanese-born British telecom executive, CEO of Safaricom (since 2010), acute myeloid leukaemia.
Nikola Dagorov, 94, Bulgarian Olympic triple jumper (1952).
Renato Dehò, 72, Italian footballer.
Norman Geisler, 86, American theologian.
Osvalda Giardi, 86, Italian high jumper and pentathlete.
Dave Gilbert, 84, Canadian politician, MHA (1985–1996).
Rolland Golden, 87, American artist.
Ennio Guarnieri, 88, Italian cinematographer (L'assoluto naturale, The Garden of the Finzi-Continis, Brother Sun, Sister Moon).
Pierre Lenhardt, 91, French Roman Catholic theologian.
Jackie Mekler, 87, South African long-distance runner, British Empire and Commonwealth silver medalist (1954).
Derrill Osborn, 76, American fashion executive (Neiman Marcus).
Al Picard, 96, Canadian ice hockey player (Sudbury Wolves, Buffalo Bisons, Dallas Texans).
Sándor Popovics, 80, Hungarian football player (Sparta Rotterdam) and manager (N.E.C., De Graafschap).
Ludy Pudluk, 76, Canadian politician, MLA (1975–1995).
Khalid bin Sultan Al Qasimi, 39, Emirati royal (Al-Qasimi) and fashion designer.
Sid Ramin, 100, American composer (West Side Story, Too Many Thieves, Stiletto), Oscar (1961) and Grammy winner (1961).
Jacques Rougeau Sr., 89, Canadian professional wrestler (NWF).
Bogusław Schaeffer, 90, Polish composer, musicologist and graphic artist.
Jerry Seltzer, 87, American roller derby promoter.
Tyler Skaggs, 27, American baseball player (Arizona Diamondbacks, Los Angeles Angels), drug overdose.
Ulrike Stanggassinger, 51, German Olympic alpine skier (1988).

2
Don Ballard, 95, American politician, member of the Georgia House of Representatives (1957–1965, 1967–1970) and Senate (1971–1982).
Leila Leah Bronner, 89, American Jewish historian and Bible scholar.
Élie Brousse, 97, French rugby league player (Roanne, Lyon, national team).
Michael Colgrass, 87, American-born Canadian composer, Pulitzer Prize winner (1978), skin cancer.
Costa Cordalis, 75, Greek-born German schlager singer.
Suzanne Eaton, 59, American biologist, asphyxiation.
Hugh Edighoffer, 90, Canadian politician.
Diana Henderson, 72, British solicitor, army officer and historian.
Lee Iacocca, 94, American automobile executive (Ford Motor Company, Chrysler) and writer (Where Have All the Leaders Gone?), complications from Parkinson's disease.
Duncan Lamont, 88, British jazz saxophonist and composer. 
Li Zuixiong, 78, Chinese conservation scientist, Vice President of the Dunhuang Research Academy.
Michelle Medina, 32, Ecuadorian singer, athlete and TV presenter, skin cancer.
José Luis Merino, 92, Spanish film director (The Hanging Woman, Scream of the Demon Lover, Réquiem para el gringo).
W. Thomas Molloy, 78, Canadian politician, Lieutenant Governor of Saskatchewan (since 2018), pancreatic cancer.
Rabin Mondal, 90, Indian painter.
Mr. Two Bits, 96, American cheerleader (University of Florida).
Francesco Pontone, 92, Italian politician, Senator (1987–2013).
Jaime Posada Díaz, 94, Colombian writer and politician, Minister of National Education (1958–1962) and Governor of Cundinamarca Department (1987–1990).
George Barclay Richardson, 94, British economist, Warden of Keble College, Oxford (1989–1994).
Richmond Shepard, 90, American theater director and mime.
Lis Verhoeven, 88, German actress and theatre director.
Bruce Wallrodt, 67, Australian shot putter and javelin thrower, Paralympic champion (1988, 1992, 1996).

3
Sudarshan Agarwal, 88, Indian politician, Governor of Uttarakhand (2003–2007) and Sikkim (2007–2008).
Perro Aguayo, 73, Mexican professional wrestler (AAA, UWA, WWF), heart attack.
Koldo Aguirre, 80, Spanish football player (Athletic Bilbao, national team) and manager (Hércules).
June Bacon-Bercey, 90, American meteorologist (NOAA, NWS, Atomic Energy Commission), frontotemporal dementia.
Jacek Baluch, 79, Polish literary scholar.
Basant Kumar Birla, 98, Indian businessman, Chairman of B.K. Birla Institute of Engineering & Technology (since 2007).
Christopher Booker, 81, British journalist (The Sunday Telegraph, Private Eye).
Pol Cruchten, 55, Luxembourgish film director (Somewhere in Europe, Wedding Night – End of the Song, Never Die Young).
Julia Farron, 96, English ballerina.
Mitsuo Itoh, 82, Japanese Grand Prix motorcycle road racer.
Arte Johnson, 90, American comedian and actor (Rowan & Martin's Laugh-In), Emmy Award winner (1969), bladder and prostate cancer.
Gary Kolb, 79, American baseball player (St. Louis Cardinals, Milwaukee Braves, Pittsburgh Pirates).
Peter Lahdenpera, 91, American Olympic skier (1960, 1964).
Malva Landa, 100, Ukrainian-born Russian geologist and human rights activist.
Li Xintian, 90, Chinese novelist.
Jared Lorenzen, 38, American football player (Kentucky Wildcats, New York Giants, Indianapolis Colts), infection.
Arseny Mironov, 101, Russian aeronautical engineer.
Nisar Nasik, 76, Pakistani poet ("Dil Dil Pakistan").
Tony Robichaux, 57, American baseball player (McNeese State) and coach (Louisiana Ragin' Cajuns), complications from a heart attack.
Alan Rogan, 68, British guitar technician (The Who), cancer.
Thomas Shardelow, 87, South African cyclist, Olympic silver medallist (1952).
Edward Shotter, 86, British Anglican priest and author, Dean of Rochester (1989–2003).
Vasco Tagliavini, 81, Italian football player (Internazionale, Udinese) and manager (Triestina).
Raymond Tarcy, 82, French politician, Senator (1980–1989).

4
Robert A. Bernhard, 91, American banker (Lehman Brothers).
H. Gopal Bhandary, 66, Indian politician, member of the Karnataka Legislative Assembly (1999–2004, 2008–2013), heart attack.
Chris Cline, 60, American billionaire mining entrepreneur, helicopter crash.
Eduardo Fajardo, 94, Spanish actor (The Two Faces of Fear, Nightmare City, Exterminators of the Year 3000).
Arturo Fernández Rodríguez, 90, Spanish actor (Red Cross Girls, College Boarding House, The Locket), stomach cancer.
Vincenzo Finocchiaro, 66, Italian Olympic swimmer (1972).
Héctor Huerta Ríos, Mexican criminal (Beltrán-Leyva Cartel), shot.
Munshi Mohammad Fazle Kader, 90, Indian citizen, awarded Friends of Liberation War Honour.
Holger Kirschke, 71, German Olympic swimmer.
Eva Mozes Kor, 85, Romanian-born American Holocaust survivor and author, founder of CANDLES Holocaust Museum and Education Center.
Leon Kossoff, 92, British painter.
Pierre Lhomme, 89, French cinematographer (Cyrano de Bergerac, Lovers Like Us, Deadly Circuit).
Robert F. Marx, 85, American scuba diver.
Wayne Mass, 73, American football player (Chicago Bears), heart attack.
Vernon McArley, 95, New Zealand cricketer (Otago).
Christopher Minikon, 86, Liberian public servant, statesman, ambassador, professor, historian, and businessman.
Vivian Perlis, 91, American musicologist.
André Pinçon, 88, French politician, Mayor of Laval (1973–1994).
Jean Royer, 81, Canadian poet.

5
Marie Borroff, 95, American poet and translator.
Dorothy Buckland-Fuller, 97, Australian sociologist.
Douglas Crimp, 74, American art historian, writer and curator, multiple myeloma.
Tzemach Cunin, 43, American rabbi.
Mohan Das, Indian politician, MLA (1996–2001).
Neil Davey, 98, Australian public servant, oversaw currency decimalisation.
Gerry Fairhead, 96, Canadian Olympic sailor (1948).
Joel Filártiga, 86, Paraguayan human rights activist and doctor.
Andrew Graham-Yooll, 75, Argentine journalist and writer.
Ugo Gregoretti, 88, Italian television and film director (Ro.Go.Pa.G., Omicron, Beautiful Families).
Eberhard Havekost, 52, German painter.
Kevin Higgins, 68, Australian footballer (Geelong, Fitzroy).
Bobby Hopkins, 62, American football player (Tampa Bay Bandits) and world champion arm-wrestler.
Hu Maozhou, 91, Chinese politician, Mayor of Chengdu (1981–1988).
Sir Wynn Hugh-Jones, 95, British diplomat and politician.
Mokhtar Kechamli, 56, Algerian football player (ASM Oran, MC Oran, national team) and manager, heart attack.
Lewis Lloyd, 60, American basketball player (Golden State Warriors, Houston Rockets).
John McCririck, 79, British horse racing journalist, lung cancer.
Lis Mellemgaard, 95, Danish insurgent spy (Holger Danske) and ophthalmologist.
José Muñoz Sánchez, 57, Spanish politician, Senator (since 2018).
Adila Mutallibova, 81, Azerbaijani socialite, First Lady (1991–1992).
Marie Ponsot, 98, American poet and literary critic.
Klaus Sahlgren, 90, Finnish diplomat.
Kathleen Sims, 77, American politician, member of the Idaho Senate (2001–2002) and House of Representatives (2010–2016).
Paolo Vinaccia, 65, Italian jazz percussionist, pancreatic cancer.
Robert M. Young, 83, American author and academic. 
Zhang Baifa, 84, Chinese politician, Vice Mayor and Executive Vice Mayor of Beijing (1983–1995).

6
Paco Alonso, 67, Mexican wrestling executive and promoter (CMLL).
Patrícia Araújo, 37, Brazilian actress and model. 
Cameron Boyce, 20, American actor (Jessie, Grown Ups, Descendants), epileptic seizure.
Bill Casimaty, 83, Australian farmer.
Martin Charnin, 84, American lyricist (Annie, Two by Two, Hot Spot) and theatre director (Shadowlands), heart attack.
Seydi Dinçtürk, 97, Turkish Olympic sprinter (1948).
João Gilberto, 88, Brazilian singer-songwriter and guitarist, pioneer of bossa nova music style.
Elka Gilmore, 59, American chef, cardiac arrest.
Peter Hamilton, 62, Australian footballer (Melbourne).
Charles Hardnett, 80, American basketball player and coach.
Ragnar Hoen, 78, Norwegian chess master.
Parviz Jalayer, 79, Iranian weightlifter, Olympic silver medalist (1968) and Asian Games champion (1966).
Eddie Jones, 84, American actor (Lois & Clark: The New Adventures of Superman, A League of Their Own, The Rocketeer).
Arman Kirakossian, 62, Armenian diplomat, Minister of Foreign Affairs (1992–1993), ambassador to the United States (1999–2005) and United Kingdom (since 2018).
Mandla Maseko, 30, South African candidate astronaut, motorcycle crash.
Denis Pain, 83, New Zealand jurist, District Court judge (1970–1990), and Olympic eventing chef d'équipe (1988, 1992).
Calvin Quate, 95, American electrical engineer.
K. L. Shivalinge Gowda, 93, Indian politician, MLA (1962–1967, 1978–1983).
Lucio Soravito de Franceschi, 79, Italian Roman Catholic prelate, Bishop of Adria-Rovigo (2004–2015).
Yannis Spathas, 68, Greek guitarist (Socrates Drank the Conium).
Gus Stager, 96, American swimming coach.
John Waddington, 81, Australian footballer (North Melbourne).

7
Edna Anderson, 96, Canadian politician, MP (1988–1993).
Salvatore Angerami, 62, Italian Roman Catholic prelate, Auxiliary Bishop of Naples (since 2014).
Artur Brauner, 100, Polish-born German film producer (The Plot to Assassinate Hitler, Angry Harvest, Europa Europa).
Jean Buckley, 87, American baseball player (Kenosha Comets, Rockford Peaches).
Steve Cannon, 84, American novelist, playwright, and arts impresario (A Gathering of the Tribes), sepsis.
Bob Fouts, 97, American broadcaster (San Francisco 49ers) and sports reporter (KPIX, KGO).
Patricia Gallerneau, 64, French politician, Deputy (2017–2019), cancer.
Rolf Gehlhaar, 75, American composer.
Jonathan Hodge, 78, British composer (Henry's Cat, Fiddley Foodle Bird, Babe), multiple organ failure.
Jeff Ingber, 83, English table tennis player.
Greg Johnson, 48, Canadian ice hockey player (Detroit Red Wings, Nashville Predators, Pittsburgh Penguins), Olympic silver medalist (1994), suicide by gunshot.
Wolfgang Joklik, 92, Austrian-born American virologist.
Joe Kadenge, 84, Kenyan football player (Abaluhya) and manager (national team), complications from a stroke.
Elizabeth Killick, 94, British naval electronics engineer, heart attack.
Ekaterina Koroleva, 20, Russian handballer, drowned.
Stefan Kwoczała, 85, Polish speedway rider, national individual champion (1959).
Liu Wenxi, 85, Chinese painter, Vice Chairman of the China Artists Association.
Ora Namir, 88, Israeli politician and diplomat, member of the Knesset (1973–1996), Minister of Labor (1992–1996), ambassador to China and Mongolia (1996–2000).
Sutopo Purwo Nugroho, 49, Indonesian civil servant and academic, Head of Indonesian National Board for Disaster Management Public Relations (since 2010), lung cancer.
Ramón Héctor Ponce, 71, Argentine footballer (Boca Juniors, Quilmes, Colo-Colo).
R. Ramakrishnan, 73, Indian businessman and politician, MP (since 1980).
Vlassis Rassias, 60, Greek writer, publisher and pagan revivalist.
Mohammad Hussaini Shahroudi, 93, Iraqi Marja'.
James D. Wallace, 82, American philosopher.
Barbara Zatler, 38, Danish model and actress (Klown).

8
Nick Garratt, 71, Australian rowing coach.
Jan Mokkenstorm, 57, Dutch psychiatrist.
Neil Oliver, 85, Australian politician, member of the Western Australian Legislative Council (1977–1989).
Rosie Ruiz, 66, American runner, 1980 Boston Marathon cheat, cancer.
Arthur Ryan, 83, Irish clothier, founder and chairman of Primark.
Paul Schramka, 91, American baseball player (Chicago Cubs).
Michael Seidenberg, 64, American bookseller and writer, heart failure.
Zhai Xiangjun, 80, Chinese translator and educator.

9
Husaini Abdullahi, 80, Nigerian vice admiral, Military Governor of Bendel State (1976–1978).
John Bailey, 74, Irish politician, member of the Dún Laoghaire–Rathdown County Council (since 2004), complications from motor neuron disease.
Rushema Begum, 85, Bangladeshi teacher and politician.
Claude Blanchard, 74, French Olympic ice hockey player (1968).
Domenico Bova, 72, Italian politician, Deputy (1994–2006).
Miriam Butterworth, 101, American politician and educator.
William E. Dannemeyer, 89, American politician, member of the U.S. House of Representatives (1979–1993) and the California State Assembly (1963–1967, 1976–1978).
Phil Freelon, 66, American architect (National Museum of African American History and Culture, National Center for Civil and Human Rights, Museum of the African Diaspora), complications from amyotrophic lateral sclerosis.	
Neil Greatrex, 68, British trade unionist and convicted fraudster, President of the Union of Democratic Mineworkers (1993–2009), complications from brain haemorrhage.
Christian Guilleminault, 80, French medical researcher.
Freddie Jones, 91, English actor (Emmerdale, The Ghosts of Motley Hall, Dune).
Johnny Kitagawa, 87, Japanese-American talent manager, founder and president of Johnny & Associates, stroke.
Glenn Mickens, 88, American baseball player (Brooklyn Dodgers), pneumonia.
Heather Nicholson, 88, New Zealand geologist and author.
Ross Perot, 89, American billionaire businessman, philanthropist and presidential candidate, founder of Electronic Data Systems and the Reform Party, leukemia.
Aaron Rosand, 92, American violinist.
Fernando de la Rúa, 81, Argentine lawyer and academic, President (1999–2001), heart and kidney failure.
Marian Spencer, 99, American politician, Vice Mayor of Cincinnati, Ohio (1983–1988).
Zaheen Tahira, 79, Pakistani actress (Khuda Ki Basti, Murad, Umm-e-Kulsoom), complications from a heart attack.
Rip Torn, 88, American actor (Cross Creek, The Larry Sanders Show, Men in Black), Emmy winner (1996), complications from Alzheimer's disease.

10
Paulo Henrique Amorim, 77, Brazilian journalist.
Reinhard Bortfeld, 92, German geophysicist.
Jim Bouton, 80, American baseball player (New York Yankees), writer (Ball Four), and actor (The Long Goodbye), cerebral amyloid angiopathy.
Valentina Cortese, 96, Italian actress (Malaya, Brother Sun, Sister Moon, Day for Night).
Lutz Fleischer, 63, German painter and graphic artist.
Karen R. Hitchcock, 76, American biologist and university administrator.
Bill Huffman, 94, American politician.
Amirali Karmali, 89, Ugandan businessman, CEO of Mukwano Group.
Lucette Lagnado, 62, Egyptian-born American journalist (The Wall Street Journal), complications from cancer.
Jerry Lawson, 75, American a cappella singer (The Persuasions), Guillain–Barré syndrome.
Motto McLean, 93, Scottish-born Canadian ice hockey player (Omaha Knights).
Walt Michaels, 89, American football player (Cleveland Browns) and coach (New York Jets).
Denise Nickerson, 62, American actress (Willy Wonka & the Chocolate Factory, Dark Shadows, Smile), seizure.
Amit Purohit, 32, Indian actor. 
Nino Randazzo, 86, Italian-Australian politician, Senator (2006–2013).
Albert Shepherd, 82, British actor (The Anniversary, Charlie Bubbles, Before Winter Comes).
James Small, 50, South African rugby player (Springboks), heart attack.
Danny Gordon Taylor, 69, American visual effects artist (Real Steel, Terminator 3: Rise of the Machines, Alita: Battle Angel), heart attack.
Dorothy Toy, 102, American tap dancer (Toy & Wing).
Gerald Weissmann, 88, Austrian-born American physician, editor-in-chief of The FASEB Journal (2006–2016).
Noel Whelan, 50, Irish politician and writer.

11
Jack Bond, 87, English cricketer (Lancashire).
Robert Francis Christian, 70, American Roman Catholic prelate, Auxiliary Bishop of San Francisco (since 2018).
Mike Christie, 69, American ice hockey player (California Golden Seals, Vancouver Canucks), kidney disease.
Robert Entwistle, 77, English cricketer (Minor Counties, Cumberland, Lancashire).
Neil Estern, 93, American sculptor.
Héctor Figueroa, 57, American labor leader, president of SEIU 32BJ, heart attack.
Dengir Mir Mehmet Fırat, 76, Turkish politician, MP (1999–2011, since 2015), lung cancer.
John Gardner, 54, Scottish legal philosopher, oesophageal cancer.
Brendan Grace, 68, Irish comedian and actor (Moondance, Father Ted), lung cancer.
Séamus Hetherton, 89, Irish Gaelic footballer (Cavan).
Soumendranath Kundu, 77, Indian cricketer (Bengal, Railways).
Vincent Lambert, 42, French quadriplegic and vegetative state right-to-die figure, court assisted starvation.
Théodore Mel Eg, 67, Ivorian politician, Minister of Culture and Francophonie (2005–2007) and of City and Salubrity (2007–2010).
Sufi Muhammad, 86, Pakistani cleric and Islamist militant, founder and leader of Tehreek-e-Nafaz-e-Shariat-e-Mohammadi (1992–2002).
Arto Nilsson, 71, Finnish boxer, Olympic bronze medallist (1968).
Pepita Pardell, 91, Spanish cinema animator pioneer, cartoonist and illustrator (Garbancito de la Mancha, Alegres vacaciones).
Siegfried Strohbach, 89, German composer and conductor. 
Rumen Surdzhiyski, 75, Bulgarian film director (Swan, Place Under the Sun).
Mark E. Talisman, 78, American legislative aide (Charles Vanik) and Jewish activist.
William H. Walls, 86, American senior judge of the District Court for the District of New Jersey (1994–2005).

12
Jorge Aguado, 93, Argentine politician and ruralist, de facto Governor of Buenos Aires Province (1982–1983) and Minister of Agriculture and Livestock (1981).
Georgios Anastassopoulos, 83, Greek journalist (Journalists' Union of the Athens Daily Newspapers) and politician, MEP (1984–1999) and Vice President (1989–1999).
Fernando J. Corbató, 93, American computer scientist, developer of Multics, complications from diabetes.
Franz Eisl, 98, Austrian Olympic sailor (1960, 1972).
David L. Ferguson, 69, American academic.
Joe Grzenda, 82, American baseball player (Detroit Tigers, Kansas City Athletics, New York Mets).
Abdul Hamid, 92, Pakistani field hockey player, Olympic champion (1960) and silver medallist (1956), lung injury.
Emily Hartridge, 35, British television presenter and internet personality, traffic collision.
Eberhard Kummer, 78, Austrian singer.
Arno Marsh, 91, American jazz saxophonist.
Hodan Nalayeh, 42, Somali-Canadian media executive and activist, shot.
Claudio Naranjo, 86, Chilean psychiatrist, co-developer of the Enneagram of Personality.
M. J. Radhakrishnan, 61, Indian cinematographer (Deshadanam, Karunam, Naalu Pennungal), heart attack.
Sadie Roberts-Joseph, 75, American civil rights advocate and museum founder (Odell S. Williams Now And Then African-American Museum), asphyxiation.
Joseph Rouleau, 90, Canadian bass opera singer.
Diane Ellingson Smith, 60, American gymnast and teacher.
Russell Smith, 70, American singer-songwriter (Amazing Rhythm Aces), cancer.
Richard M. Thorne, 76, American physicist.
Matthew Trundle, 53, British-born New Zealand classics and ancient history academic (University of Auckland), leukemia.
Stéphanie Windisch-Graetz, 79, Austrian photographer.
Jean-Pierre Worms, 84, French sociologist and politician, Deputy (1981–1993).

13
Abu Bakar, 66, Indonesian politician, regent of West Bandung (2008–2018).
Bob Bastian, 80, American politician, member of the Pennsylvania House of Representatives (1999–2008), crushed by tractor.
Richard Carter, 65, Australian actor (Mad Max: Fury Road, The Great Gatsby, Rafferty's Rules).
Cyril Edwards, 71, British medievalist and translator, heart attack.
Augusto Fantozzi, 79, Italian lawyer and politician, Minister of Economy and Finance (1995–1996).
June Felter, 99, American painter.
Joginder Singh Gharaya, 92, Indian army lieutenant general.
Sadashiv Vasantrao Gorakshkar, 86, Indian writer and art curator.
Terry Hodgkinson, 70, British land developer, Chairman of Yorkshire Forward (2003–2010).
Harlan Lane, 82, American psychologist.
Bill Luxton, 92, Canadian actor and announcer (Tukiki and His Search for a Merry Christmas).
Isaac Lesiba Maphotho, 88, South African revolutionary and politician, MPL (1994–2014).
Paul F. Markham, 89, American attorney, U.S. Attorney for the District of Massachusetts (1966–1969), key figure in the Chappaquiddick incident.
Kerry Reed-Gilbert, 62, Australian author and Aboriginal rights activist.
Rod Richards, 72, Welsh politician, MP for Clwyd North West (1992–1997), Leader of the Welsh Conservative Party (1999), cancer.
Paolo Sardi, 84, Italian Roman Catholic cardinal, Patron of the Sovereign Military Order of Malta (2009–2014).
Aleksandr Shumidub, 55, Belarusian Olympic ice hockey player (1998) and manager.
Victor Sosnora, 83, Russian poet and playwright.
Wang Jiafu, 88, Chinese legal scholar, Director of the Institute of Law, Chinese Academy of Social Sciences.
Ida Wyman, 93, American photographer.

14
Carl Bertil Agnestig, 95, Swedish music teacher and composer.
Frieder Burda, 83, German art collector.
Rahul Desikan, 41, Indian-born American neuroscientist, complications from amyotrophic lateral sclerosis.
Bianca Devins, 17, American social media personality, stabbed.
Claire Dwyer, 55, British geographer, cancer.
Robert Elgie, 54, Irish academic.
Hussain Muhammad Ershad, 89, Bangladeshi military officer and politician, Chief of Army Staff (1978–1986) and President (1983–1990), Leader of the Opposition (since 2019), MDS.
Hoàng Tụy, 91, Vietnamese mathematician.
Charlee Jacob, 67, American author.
Nereo Laroni, 76, Italian politician, Mayor of Venice (1985–1987) and MEP (1989–1994), complications from heart surgery.
Margaret Mascarenhas, American author.
Mike Maser, 72, American football coach (Miami Dolphins, Carolina Panthers, Jacksonville Jaguars).
Ernie Mims, 86, American television host (WOC).
Lavenia Padarath, 74, Fijian politician, MP (1999–2001, 2006) and President of the Labour Party (since 2015).
Karl Shiels, 47, Irish actor (Fair City, Into the Badlands, Henry IV, Part 1).
Ray Skelly, 78, Canadian politician.
James Taylor, 89, Scottish cricketer.
Bella Tovey, 92, Polish Holocaust survivor.
Sterling Tucker, 95, American politician and civil rights activist, Chairman of the Council of the District of Columbia (1975–1979), heart and kidney failure.
Arvind Varma, 71, Indian-born American chemical engineer.
Pernell Whitaker, 55, American boxer, four-weight world champion, Olympic champion (1984), traffic collision.
Yu Dunkang, 89, Chinese philosopher and historian of philosophy.
Paul Albert Zipfel, 83, American Roman Catholic prelate, Bishop of Bismarck (1996–2011).

15
Frank Ackerman, 72, American economist.
Marc Batchelor, 49, South African footballer (Kaizer Chiefs, Orlando Pirates), shot.
Brian Coote, 89, New Zealand legal academic (University of Auckland).
Mortimer Caplin, 103, American lawyer and educator, IRS Commissioner (1961–1964).
Ousmane Tanor Dieng, 72, Senegalese politician, Vice-president of the Socialist International (since 1996).
Craig Fallon, 36, British judoka, world champion (2005), suicide.
Feng Yuanwei, 88, Chinese politician (6th CPPCC Committee Chairman of Sichuan).
Harald Fereberger, 90, Austrian Olympic sailor (1952, 1960, 1972).
Doug Flett, 83, Australian songwriter.
Alexis Galanos, 78, Cypriot politician, president of the House of Representatives (1991–1996) and Mayor-in-exile of Famagusta (since 2006).
Edith Irby Jones, 91, American physician.
Raymond Choo Kong, 70, Trinidad and Tobago actor, stabbed.
Bruce Laingen, 96, American diplomat, Ambassador to Malta (1977–1979), captive during the Iran hostage crisis, complications from Parkinson's disease.
Sir Fergus Millar, 84, British ancient historian, Camden Professor of Ancient History (1984–2002).
Werner Müller, 73, German businessman and politician, Federal Minister for Economics and Technology (1998–2002).
Johanna Narten, 88, German linguist (Narten present).
Sir Rex Richards, 96, British chemist and academic.
Joe Rayment, 84, English footballer.
Byambasuren Sharav, 66, Mongolian composer and pianist.
Thorsteinn I. Sigfusson, 65, Icelandic physicist.
Hugo Tolentino Dipp, 88, Dominican politician, President of the Chamber of Deputies (1982–1987).
Margaret Todd, 101, Canadian golfer and BC Sports Hall of Fame inductee (1973).
Olga Vyalikova, 65, Russian actress (An Ordinary Miracle).

16
Judit Bar-Ilan, 60, Israeli computer scientist.
Adam Bob, 51, American football player (New York Jets), liver disease.
Rosa María Britton, 82, Panamanian doctor and novelist.
Ernie Broglio, 83, American baseball player (St. Louis Cardinals, Chicago Cubs), cancer.
Daniel Callahan, 88, American philosopher.
Don Chelf, 87, American football player (Buffalo Bills), stroke.
Chung Doo-un, 62, South Korean politician, Vice-Mayor of Seoul (2000–2003), MP (2004–2016), suicide.
Johnny Clegg, 66, British-born South African singer and musician (Juluka, Savuka), pancreatic cancer.
Barry Coe, 84, American actor (Jaws 2, Peyton Place, Bonanza), myelodysplastic syndrome.
Raja Dhale, 78, Indian writer and anti-caste discrimination activist, co-founder of Dalit Panthers.
Howard Engel, 88, Canadian author, pneumonia.
Michael English, 88, British politician, MP for Nottingham West (1964–1983).
Jonathan Gathorne-Hardy, 86, British author.
Sonia Infante, 75, Mexican actress (El precio de la fama, Un rostro en mi pasado, Young People), cardiac arrest.
Terry Isaac, 60, American painter, heart attack.
Pat Kelly, 74, Jamaican rocksteady and reggae singer, complications of kidney disease.
James Moeller, 85, American jurist, Justice of the Arizona Supreme Court (1987–1998).
Claude-Hélène Perrot, 90, French Africanist and academic.
Himayat Ali Shair, 93, Pakistani poet and writer.
John Paul Stevens, 99, American judge, Associate Justice of the Supreme Court (1975–2010), complications from a stroke.
Su Shuyang, 81, Chinese playwright, novelist, and screenwriter.
John Tanton, 85, American anti-immigration activist.
Bill Vitt, American drummer.

17
Andrea Camilleri, 93, Italian writer (Salvo Montalbano) and television writer (Le inchieste del commissario Maigret), complications from a heart attack.
Ismail Changezi, 65, Pakistani actor.
Warren Cole, 78, New Zealand rower, Olympic champion (1968).
Swarup Dutta, 78, Indian actor (Apanjan, Uphaar, Andha Atit).
Pumpsie Green, 85, American baseball player (Boston Red Sox, New York Mets).
Nikola Hajdin, 96, Serbian civil engineer, president of the Serbian Academy of Sciences and Arts (2003–2015).
S. R. Mehrotra, 88, Indian historian.
Giuseppe Merlo, 91, Italian tennis player.
Ian Murphy, 40, American journalist and satirist (The Beast).
Duane Mutch, 94, American politician, member of the North Dakota Senate (1959–1976; 1979–2006).
Wesley Pruden, 83, American journalist and editor (The Washington Times).
Dragomir Racić, 72, Serbian footballer (Red Star Belgrade, Castellón).
Donald W. Thompson, 81, American film director, producer and writer (A Thief in the Night).
Boris Vorobyov, 69, Soviet Olympic rower (1972).
Robert Waseige, 79, Belgian footballer and coach (Standard Liège, national team).

18
Yukiya Amano, 72, Japanese diplomat, Director General of the International Atomic Energy Agency (since 2009).
André Bradford, 48, Portuguese politician and journalist, Azores MLA (since 2004), MEP (since 2019), cardiac arrest.
Charles Ceccaldi-Raynaud, 94, French lawyer and politician, Senator (1995–2004), Deputy (1993–1995), Mayor of Puteaux (1969–2004).
Luciano De Crescenzo, 90, Italian writer, actor and film director (Così parlò Bellavista), lung disease.
Yves Forest, 98, Canadian politician, MP (1963–1972).
Bob Frank, 75, American singer-songwriter.
Rosemary Ellen Guiley, 69, American paranormal investigator.
David Hedison, 92, American actor (The Fly, Live and Let Die, Voyage to the Bottom of the Sea).
Kurt Julius Isselbacher, 93, German-born American gastroenterologist, author and researcher, stroke.
Ben Kinchlow, 82, American author, minister and televangelist, co-host of The 700 Club.
Robert Milli, 86, American actor (Guiding Light, Klute, Playing for Keeps).
Macy Morse, 98, American peace and anti-nuclear activist.
Roelof Nelissen, 88, Dutch politician and banker, Deputy Prime Minister (1971–1973), Minister of Finance (1971–1973), CEO of the AMRO Bank (1983–1991).
Mitch Petrus, 32, American football player (New York Giants), heatstroke.
P. Rajagopal, 72, Indian restaurateur and convicted murderer, founder of Saravana Bhavan, complications from a heart attack.
Darlene Tompkins, 78, American actress (Blue Hawaii), stroke.
Zhao Meng, 62, Chinese sculptor.
Japanese victims of the Kyoto Animation arson attack:
Naomi Ishida, 49, colorist (Hyouka, Amagi Brilliant Park, A Silent Voice).
Yoshiji Kigami, 61, animation director (Munto, Tamako Market, Nichijou).
Futoshi Nishiya, 37, animator and character designer (Clannad, Inuyasha, Kanon).
Yasuhiro Takemoto, 47, animation director (Hyouka, Amagi Brilliant Park, Miss Kobayashi's Dragon Maid).

19
Arswendo Atmowiloto, 70, Indonesian journalist and writer, prostate cancer.
Inger Berggren, 85, Swedish schlager singer ("Sol och vår").
John Elya, 90, Lebanese-born American Melkite Greek Catholic hierarch, Bishop of Newton (1993–2004).
Shirley Hardman, 90, New Zealand sprint athlete, British Empire Games silver medalist (1950).
Emanuel Hatzofe, 90, Israeli sculptor.
Rutger Hauer, 75, Dutch actor (Blade Runner, Nighthawks, The Hitcher).
Ágnes Heller, 90, Hungarian philosopher and political theorist (The New School), drowned.
David Hunt, 84, Australian judge, member of the Supreme Court of New South Wales (1991–1998).
Jeremy Kemp, 84, British actor (Top Secret!, Z-Cars, The Blue Max).
William Morton, 58, Scottish cricketer (Warwickshire Bears, national team).
Don Mossi, 90, American baseball player (Cleveland Indians, Detroit Tigers).
César Pelli, 92, Argentine architect (Petronas Towers, Carnegie Hall Tower).
Bert Rechichar, 89, American football player (Baltimore Colts).
Dixon Seeto, Fijian hotelier and politician, Senator (2006), complications from a traffic collision.
Jerome B. Simandle, 70, American senior judge (U.S. District Court for the District of New Jersey), liver cancer.
Marcel Alain de Souza, 65, Beninese politician and banker, Minister for Development, Economic Analysis and Forecast (2011–2015), President of the ECOWAS Commission (2016–2018).
Godfried Toussaint, 75, Canadian computer scientist. 
Marylou Whitney, 93, American socialite, philanthropist and Thoroughbred racehorse breeder.
Patrick Winston, 76, American computer scientist, Director of the MIT Artificial Intelligence Laboratory (1972–1997).
Yao Lee, 96, Chinese singer ("Rose, Rose, I Love You").

20
Leif Jørgen Aune, 94, Norwegian politician, Minister of Local Government (1973–1978).
Paul Barker, 83, British journalist.
Paddy Bassett, 101, New Zealand agricultural scientist, first female graduate of Massey University.
Antonino Cuffaro, 87, Italian politician, MP (1976–1987, 1994–1996).
Sheila Dikshit, 81, Indian politician, MP (1984–1989), Chief Minister of Delhi (1998–2013) and Governor of Kerala (2014), cardiac arrest.
Roberto Fernández Retamar, 89, Cuban poet and essayist.
R. James Harvey, 97, American politician and judge, member of the U.S. House of Representatives (1961–1974) and the U.S. District Court for the Eastern District of Michigan (1973–1984).
Peter McNamara, 64, Australian tennis player and coach, prostate cancer.
Marisa Merz, 93, Italian artist (Arte povera).
Ilaria Occhini, 85, Italian actress (Doctor and the Healer, Loose Cannons).
Lance Pearson, 82, New Zealand cricketer.
Liane Russell, 95, Austrian-born American geneticist and conservationist.

21
Eddie Bohan, 86, Irish politician, Senator (1987–2007).
Hugo Cóccaro, 65, Argentine politician, Governor of Tierra del Fuego (2005–2007).
José Manuel Estepa Llaurens, 93, Spanish Roman Catholic cardinal, Military Ordinary of Spain (1986–2003).
Mange Ram Garg, 83, Indian politician, member of the Delhi Legislative Assembly.
Trish Godman, 79, Scottish politician, MSP (1999–2011).
Francisco Grau, 72, Spanish military officer and composer, Director of the Musical Unit of the Royal Guard (1988–2008).
Yelena Grigoryeva, 41, Russian LGBT activist, stabbed and strangled.
Nick Harrison, 37, American racing crew chief (Phoenix Racing), mixed drug intoxication.
Laurie Hergenhan, 88, Australian literary scholar.
Ben Johnston, 93, American microtonal composer.
Mark Kleiman, 68, American criminologist, complications from a kidney transplant.
Paul Krassner, 87, American writer and political activist (The Realist).
Yaakov Malkin, 92, Israeli writer and literary critic.
Juan Carlos Márquez, 48, Spanish-Venezuelan businessman, asphyxiation.
Robert Morgenthau, 99, American lawyer, New York County District Attorney (1975–2009) and U.S. Attorney for the Southern District of New York (1961–1962; 1962–1970).
Ann Moyal, 93, Australian historian.
Éric Névé, 57, French film producer (Dobermann, Sheitan, Suburra).
Ram Chandra Paswan, 57, Indian politician, MP (since 2014), heart attack.
Claro Pellosis, 84, Filipino Olympic sprinter (1960), cardiac arrest.
Peter Ramsay, 79, New Zealand educationalist (University of Waikato) and daffodil breeder.
A. K. Roy, 90, Indian politician, MP (1977–1984, 1989–1991).
Wong Po-yan, 96, Hong Kong industrialist and politician, member of the Legislative Council (1979–1988) and chairman of the Airport Authority (1995–1999).
Adel Zaky, 71, Egyptian Roman Catholic prelate, Vicar Apostolic of Alexandria (since 2009).
Michael Zearott, 81, American conductor and composer.

22
Dan Clemens, 74, American politician, member of the Missouri Senate (2002–2010).
Daniel Rae Costello, 58, Fijian-born Samoan guitarist, cancer.
Petra Fuhrmann, 63, German politician, member of Landtag of Hesse (1994-2014).
Peter Hamm, 82, German poet and writer.
Christopher C. Kraft Jr., 95, American aerospace engineer, Director of Johnson Space Center (1972–1982).
Brigitte Kronauer, 78, German writer.
Hans Lagerqvist, 79, Swedish Olympic pole vaulter (1972), brain cancer.
Juan Rodolfo Laise, 93, Argentine Roman Catholic prelate, Bishop of San Luis (1971–2001).
Li Peng, 90, Chinese politician, Premier (1987–1998), Vice Premier (1983–1987), and Chairman of the Standing Committee of the National People's Congress (1998–2003).
Richard A. Macksey, 87, American academic.
Leon Marr, 71, Canadian film director (Dancing in the Dark).
Nikos Milas, 91, Greek Olympic basketball player (1952).
Giuliana Morandini, 81, Italian writer and literary critic.
Viktor Musiyaka, 73, Ukrainian politician, Deputy (1994–1998, 2002–2006), leader of the Forward, Ukraine! party.
Art Neville, 81, American singer-songwriter and keyboardist (The Meters, The Neville Brothers).
Michael Nauenberg, 84, German-born American theoretical physicist.
Sea of Class, 4, Irish racehorse, euthanised for abdominal cancer.
Bill Schulz, 80, American journalist (Reader's Digest).
Wayne See, 95, American basketball player (Waterloo Hawks).
Bassam Shakaa, 89, Palestinian politician, mayor of Nablus (1976–1982).
Hilary Squires, 86, South African judge and barrister.
Gunilla Tjernberg, 68, Swedish politician.

23
Khwaja Muhammad Aslam, 97, Pakistani Olympic athlete (1952).
Rella Braithwaite, 96, Canadian author.
Cao Shuangming, 89, Chinese general, Commander of the PLA Air Force (1992–1994).
Chaser, 15, American Border Collie with the largest-tested non-human memory.
Aleksandr Chumakov, 92, Russian Olympic sailor (1952, 1956).
Maxim Dadashev, 28, Russian NABF super lightweight champion boxer, head injuries sustained in match.
Ruth Gotlieb, 96, British-born New Zealand politician, Wellington City Councillor (1983–2001).
Jan Hrbatý, 77, Czech ice hockey player, Olympic silver medallist (1968).
Peter Horn, 84, Czech-born South African writer and critic, cancer.
Danny Keogh, 71, Ugandan-born South African actor (Invictus, Zulu, The Red Sea Diving Resort).
Gabe Khouth, 46, Canadian actor (It, Mobile Suit Gundam SEED, Once Upon a Time), cardiac arrest.
Pavel Kučera, 79, Czech lawyer and judge, vice president of the Supreme Court of the Czech Republic.
Danika McGuigan, 33, Irish actress (Can't Cope, Won't Cope, Philomena, The Secret Scripture), cancer.
Charan Narzary, 86, Indian politician, MP (1977–1980), complications from a fall.
Dorothy Olsen, 103, American aviatrix.
Bobby Park, 73, English footballer (Aston Villa, Wrexham, Hartlepool United), cancer.
Michael Roth, 83, German engineer.
Sir Patrick Sheehy, 88, British businessman (BAT Industries).
Yuriy Shlyakhov, 36, Ukrainian Olympic diver (2008), heart disease.
Barney Smith, 98, American plumber, artist and museum curator.
Ferdinand von Bismarck, 88, German landowner and lawyer.
Thomas Milton Weatherald, 81, Canadian politician, MLA (1964–1975).
Lois Wille, 87, American journalist, Pulitzer Prize winner (1963, 1989), stroke.

24
Claes Andersson, 82, Finnish writer, psychiatrist and politician, MP (1987–1999, 2007–2008).
David Caplan, 54, Canadian politician, MPP (1997–2011).
Sammy Chapman, 81, Northern Irish football player (Mansfield Town, Portsmouth) and manager (Wolves).
Chen Hu, 57, Chinese military physician and stem cell researcher, heart attack.
Mathias J. DeVito, 88, American lawyer and businessman, CEO of The Rouse Company (1979–1994), kidney failure.
Sergio Di Giulio, 74, Italian voice actor and actor (One Hamlet Less).
Bernard Evans, 82, English footballer (Oxford United, Wrexham, Queens Park Rangers).
Margaret Fulton, 94, Scottish-born Australian chef and cookbook writer (The Margaret Fulton Cookbook).
Hwang Byungsng, 49, South Korean poet. (body found on this date)
Cathy Inglese, 60, American college basketball coach (Vermont, Boston College, Rhode Island), fall.
Ajoy Mukhopadhyay, 90, Indian politician.
Nam Gi-nam, 77, South Korean film director (Night Fairy), cancer.
Sir Frederick Sowrey, 96, British air marshal.
Jaime Trobo, 62, Uruguayan politician, Minister of Sports and Youth (2000–2002) and Deputy (since 1990), cancer.
Trudy, 63, American gorilla, world's oldest gorilla in captivity.
Manfred Uhlig, 91, German actor (Hands Up or I'll Shoot).
José Vidal, 81, Venezuelan footballer (Deportivo Lara, national team).
Roger Warren, 75, Canadian miner and murderer.

25
Giorgio Arlorio, 90, Italian film director and screenwriter (The Shortest Day, Ogro, Once Upon a Crime).
Farouk al-Fishawy, 67, Egyptian actor (The Suspect), cancer.
Simon Bendall, 82, English numismatist.
Anner Bylsma, 85, Dutch cellist.
Peter Edwards, 88, British-born Canadian vexillologist.
Beji Caid Essebsi, 92, Tunisian politician, President (since 2014), Prime Minister (2011), and Minister of Foreign Affairs (1981–1986).
Curt Faudon, 70, Austrian film director.
John Ferriter, 59, American talent agent (William Morris Agency) and producer, complications from pancreatitis.
Georg, Duke of Hohenberg, 90, Austrian aristocrat, Head of the House of Hohenberg (since 1977).
Asao Hirano, 92, Japanese medical researcher, discoverer of Hirano bodies.
Jesper Juul, 71, Danish author, pneumonia.
Jorma Kinnunen, 77, Finnish javelin thrower, Olympic silver medalist (1968).
M. Owen Lee, 89, American Roman Catholic priest and music scholar.
Mihai Mandache, 58, Romanian Olympic swimmer (1980).
Danny McCarthy, 76, Welsh footballer (Cardiff City, Abergavenny Thursdays, Merthyr Tydfil). (death announced on this date)
Jimmy Patton, 87, British comedian (Patton Brothers, ChuckleVision), cancer.
Pierre Péan, 81, French journalist and author.
P. J. Qualter, 76, Irish hurler (Galway).
Scott Rubenstein, 71, American television writer and story editor (Star Trek: The Next Generation).
Óscar Enrique Sánchez, 64, Guatemalan Olympic footballer (1976), (Comunicaciones, national team).
Victor Swenson, 83, American educator.
Bruce Webster, 91, Australian broadcaster and politician, member of the New South Wales Legislative Assembly for Pittwater (1975–1978).

26
Richard Berg, 78, American wargame designer.
Boris Bračulj, 79, Croatian football player and manager.
Hugh Brogan, 83, British historian and biographer.
Arnie Brown, 77, Canadian ice hockey player (New York Rangers, Detroit Red Wings, Toronto Maple Leafs).
Mohamed E. El-Hawary, 76, Egyptian-born Canadian scientist.
Lillian Faralla, 94, American baseball player (South Bend Blue Sox).
Graham Freudenberg, 85, Australian political speechwriter.
Monty Gordon, 87, Canadian Olympic bobsledder (1964).
Hwung Hwung-hweng, 72, Taiwanese hydraulic engineer, founder and chairman of the Ocean Affairs Council (2018–2019).
Christoforos Liontakis, 74, Greek poet and translator.
Bryan Magee, 89, British philosopher and politician, MP (1974–1983).
Joan Martin, 85, American baseball player (South Bend Blue Sox).
T. K. Nallappan, 87, Indian politician, MLA (1980–1985).
Ken Okoth, 41, Kenyan politician, cancer.
Jaime Lucas Ortega y Alamino, 82, Cuban Roman Catholic cardinal, Archbishop of San Cristóbal de la Habana (1981–2016), pancreatic cancer.
Vivian Paley, 90, American educator.
Pascual Rabal Petriz, 89, Spanish politician, Senator (1996–2000) and Mayor of Jaca (1995–1999).
Alberto Ponce, 84, Spanish classical guitarist and teacher.
Attoor Ravi Varma, 88, Indian poet and translator, pneumonia.
Kevin Roster, 36, American poker player and assisted suicide advocate.
Dagfinn Stenseth, 82, Norwegian diplomat. 
Russi Taylor, 75, American voice actress (Disney's House of Mouse, The Simpsons, DuckTales), colon cancer.
Bill Walker, 85, American football player (Edmonton Eskimos).
Marty Wilson, 62, British poker player, cancer.

27
Zenon Begier, 83, Polish Olympic athlete (1960, 1964).
Chester Caddas, 83, American football coach (Pacific Tigers, Colorado State Rams).
Tom Campbell, 81, Scottish philosopher.
Paul Connerton, 79, British social anthropologist.
Carlos Cruz-Diez, 95, Venezuelan artist.
Dianne Foster, 90, Canadian actress (Bad for Each Other, Drive a Crooked Road, The Violent Men).
Andrew Golden, 33, American convicted murderer, traffic collision.
Johann Kresnik, 79, Austrian dancer, choreographer, and theater director.
Edward Lewis, 99, American film producer (Spartacus, Grand Prix, Missing).
Keith Lincoln, 80, American football player (San Diego Chargers).
Humphrey Mijnals, 88, Surinamese-born Dutch footballer (Robinhood, DOS Utrecht, national team).
Mike Roarke, 88, American baseball player and coach (Detroit Tigers, St. Louis Cardinals, San Diego Padres).
Işılay Saygın, 72, Turkish politician.
John Robert Schrieffer, 88, American physicist, Nobel laureate (1972).
Samprada Singh, 94, Indian generic drug manufacturer, founder of Alkem Laboratories.
Roman Virastyuk, 51, Ukrainian Olympic shot putter (1996, 2000, 2004), complications of heart surgery.

28
Valerik Apinian, 69, Armenian painter.
Ferruh Bozbeyli, 92, Turkish politician, Chairman of the Democratic Party (1970–1978) and Speaker of the Grand National Assembly (1965–1970).
Ian Drohan, 86, Australian football player (St Kilda Football Club).
Walter Fiers, 88, Belgian molecular biologist.
Eduardo Gómez, 68, Spanish actor and comedian (Aquí no hay quien viva, La que se avecina, Butterfly's Tongue), cancer.
George Hilton, 85, Uruguayan actor (The Masked Man Against the Pirates, The Brute and the Beast, Man Called Invincible).
Peter Bonu Johnson, 56, Gambian football player and  manager (national team).
Vladimir Kara-Murza Sr., 59, Russian journalist and TV host, co-founder of NTV.
Li Jisheng, 76, Chinese aerospace engineer.
Peter McConnell, 82, English footballer (Carlisle United, Leeds United, Bradford City).
Loek van Mil, 34, Dutch baseball player (Curaçao Neptunus, Tohoku Rakuten Golden Eagles, national team).
Michael Moxon, 77, British Anglican cleric, Dean of Truro (1998–2004).
Howard Nathan, 47, American basketball player (DePaul Blue Demons, Atlanta Hawks).
George Parshall, 89, American chemist.
Bartolo Pellegrino, 84, Italian politician, Sicilian Regional Deputy (1971–1976, 1991–2003), founder of the New Sicily party.
Jaipal Reddy, 77, Indian politician, Minister of Earth Sciences and Science and Technology (2012–2014) and MP (1984–2014), pneumonia.
Cesare Rizzi, 79, Italian politician, Deputy (1996–2006).
Richard Rosenbaum, 88, American judge, member of the New York Supreme Court (1970–1972), chairman of the New York Republican State Committee (1972–1977).
Donkupar Roy, 64, Indian politician, Chief Minister of Meghalaya (2008–2009), stomach disease.
Bandar bin Abdulaziz Al Saud, 96, Saudi royal.
M. K. Seetharam Kulal, 79, Indian Tulu-Kannada dramatist.
Yuu Shimaka, 70, Japanese voice actor (Kingdom Hearts, Ergo Proxy, Code Geass).
Ruth de Souza, 98, Brazilian actress (The Landowner's Daughter, Macumba Love, A Glass of Rage), pneumonia.
Richard Stone, 90, American politician, U.S. Senator (1975–1980), Secretary of State of Florida (1971–1974) and Ambassador to Denmark (1991–1993), complications from pneumonia.
Kevin Stonehouse, 59, English footballer (Blackburn Rovers, Blackpool, Carlisle United).
Stanley Weintraub, 90, American historian and author.
Harrison Wilson Jr., 94, American basketball coach and educator, President of Norfolk State University (1975–1997).

29
Egil Danielsen, 85, Norwegian javelin thrower, Olympic champion (1956).
Max Falkenstien, 95, American radio sportscaster (University of Kansas).
Asghar Ghandchi, 91, Iranian entrepreneur.
Doris Goddard, 89, Australian cabaret singer and actress.
Mukesh Goud, 60, Indian politician, cancer.
Traian Ivănescu, 86, Romanian football player and coach.
Shamim Kabir, 74, Bangladeshi cricketer, cancer.
Joyce Laboso, 58, Kenyan politician, Deputy Speaker of the National Assembly  (2008–2017) and Governor of Bomet County (since 2017), cancer.
Enrique Lafourcade, 91, Chilean writer, critic and journalist.
Tom Manning, 73, American terrorist (United Freedom Front).
Vasil Metodiev, 84, Bulgarian footballer (Akademik Sofia, Lokomotiv Sofia, Dobrudzha Dobrich)
Mona-Liisa Nousiainen, 36, Finnish Olympic cross-country skier (2014), cancer.
Vitthal Radadiya, 60, Indian politician, MP (2009–2014), cancer.
Ras G, 40, American hip hop producer (Brainfeeder) and disc jockey.
Archie Roboostoff, 67, American Olympic footballer (1972).
Tuvya Ruebner, 95, Israeli poet and translator.
V. G. Siddhartha, 60, Indian businessman and founder of Café Coffee Day, suicide by jumping.
Zdeněk Srstka, 83, Czech Olympic weightlifter (1960), stuntman and actor (Poslední propadne peklu).
Barbara Staff, 94, American political activist.
Sam Trimble, 84, Australian cricketer (Queensland).
Wang Qidong, 97, Chinese materials scientist and politician, Vice President of Zhejiang University (1978–1984), Vice Chairman of Zhejiang People's Congress.
Werner von Moltke, 83, German decathlete, European champion (1966).

30
Jean Arasanayagam, 87, Sri Lankan poet and fiction writer.
Morton Bahr, 93, American labor union leader, pancreatic cancer.
Albert W. Bally, 94, American geologist.
Marcian Bleahu, 95, Romanian geologist, writer and politician, Senator (1990–1992, 1996–2000) and Minister of the Environment (1991–1992).
Nick Buoniconti, 78, American Hall of Fame football player (Miami Dolphins, Boston Patriots) and medical research advocate (Miami Project to Cure Paralysis).
Deep Impact, 17, Japanese champion racehorse (Japanese Triple Crown, Japan Cup) and sire, euthanised.
Antonio Franchi, 83, Italian racing cyclist.
Subir Gokarn, 59, Indian economist, Deputy Governor of the Reserve Bank of India (2009–2013).
Ron Hughes, 89, Welsh football player (Chester, Holywell Town) and manager (Mold Alexandra).
John Humble, 63, British hoaxer, claimed to be the Yorkshire Ripper.
Mari Carmen Izquierdo, 69, Spanish sports journalist (Televisión Española, Marca), pancreatic cancer.
W. Roy McCutcheon, 89, Canadian college administrator, President of Seneca College (1984–1992).
Malcolm Nash, 74, Welsh cricketer.
John Petroske, 84, American Olympic silver medallist ice hockey player (1956).
Rebecca Roeber, 61, American politician, member of the Missouri House of Representatives (since 2015).
Karsten Schubert, 57, German art dealer, medullary thyroid cancer.
Don Suggs, 74, American artist.
Ian Van Bellen, 73, English rugby union and rugby league player.
R. Verman, 72, Indian art director (Jewel Thief, Guide, Hum), heart attack.
Zhao Zhihong, 46, Chinese serial killer and rapist, executed by firing squad.

31
Martín Arzola Ortega, 42, Mexican convicted drug lord (Jalisco New Generation Cartel), shot.
Marcel Berlins, 77, French legal journalist, brain haemorrhage.
Chen Shunyao, 101, Chinese politician and academic administrator, deputy party secretary of Tsinghua University.
María Auxiliadora Delgado, 82, Uruguayan civil servant, First Lady (2005–2010, since 2015), heart attack.
Brendan Fennelly, 63, Irish hurling manager and player.
Charles François, 96, Belgian scientist.
Armand Jung, 68, French politician, Deputy (1997–2016).
Hamza bin Laden, 29–30, Saudi jihadist (al-Qaeda), shot. (death announced on this date)
George I. Mavrodes, 92, American philosopher.
Raffaele Pisu, 94, Italian comedian and actor (Susanna Whipped Cream, Weekend, Italian Style, The Consequences of Love), Nastro d'Argento winner (2005).
Harold Prince, 91, American theatre director and producer (The Phantom of the Opera, Fiddler on the Roof, West Side Story).
Steve Sawyer, 63, American environmentalist and activist, Executive Director of Greenpeace, co-founder of the Global Wind Energy Council, pneumonia and lung cancer.
John Scarlett, 72, Australian footballer (Geelong, South Melbourne).
Steve Talboys, 52, English footballer (Wimbledon, Watford).
Jean-Luc Thérier, 73, French rally driver.
Guido Vandone, 89, Italian footballer (Torino).

References

2019-07
 07